The Combustion Institute is an educational non-profit, international, scientific and engineering society whose purpose is to promote research in combustion science. The institute was established in 1954, and its headquarters are in Pittsburgh, Pennsylvania, United States. The current president of The Combustion Institute is Philippe Dagaut (2021-).

Foundation and mission 
The support of this important field of study spanning many scientific and engineering disciplines is done through the discussion of research findings at regional, national and the biennial international symposia, and through the publication of the Proceedings of the Combustion Institute and the institute's journals, Combustion and Flame and the affiliated journals Progress in Energy and Combustion Science, Combustion Science and Technology and Combustion Theory and Modelling.

The institute serves as the parent organization for thirty three national sections organized in many countries (the US being divided into three sections) as of 2012:

In honor of fiftieth anniversary of Combustion Institute, the leading combustion scientists John D. Buckmaster, Paul Clavin, Amable Liñán, Moshe Matalon, Norbert Peters, Gregory Sivashinsky and Forman A. Williams wrote a paper in the Proceedings of the Combustion Institute.

International symposium on combustion
The international symposium on combustion is organised by the Combustion Institute biennially. The first symposium on combustion was held in 1928 in the United States and the first international symposium on combustion was held on 1948, even though the combustion institute itself was found on 1954. Thirty seven symposiums has been held so far and the 38th symposium was to be held on 2020 but is postponed to 2021.

Institute Awards 
During each International Symposium, The Combustion Institute awards the following:
Bernard Lewis Gold Medal – established in 1958 and awarded for brilliant research in the field of combustion.
Alfred C. Egerton Gold Medal – established in 1958 and awarded for distinguished, continuing and encouraging contributions to the field of combustion.
Silver Combustion Medal – established in 1958 and awarded to an outstanding paper presented at the previous symposium.
The Hottel Lecture.
Ya B. Zeldovich Gold Medal – established in 1990 and awarded for outstanding contribution to the theory of combustion or detonation.
Bernard Lewis Fellowship – established in 1996 during the 26th International Symposium, this award is awarded to encourage high quality research in combustion by young scientists and engineers.
Distinguished Paper Award – established in 1996 during the 31st International Symposium, this award is presented to the paper in each of the twelve colloquia of a  Symposium which is judged to be most distinguished in quality, achievement and significance.
Bernard Lewis Visiting Lecturer Fellowship.
Hiroshi Tsuji Early Career Researcher Award.

See also 
International Flame Research Foundation

References 

American engineering organizations
Organizations established in 1954
Combustion